Kemak may refer to:

 Kemak people
 Kemak language